Königsforst is a terminus station on the Cologne Stadtbahn line 9, located in Cologne. The station lies in Rath/Heumar in the district of Kalk.

The station was opened on 27 August 1904 and today consists of two side platforms and one bay platform with together two rail tracks.

See also 
 List of Cologne KVB stations
 Königsforst

External links 
 station info page 
 station diagram map

References 

Cologne KVB stations
Kalk, Cologne
Railway stations in Germany opened in 1904